Carl Eduard Adolph Petzold  (14 January 1815 – August 1891) was a German landscape gardener.

Life 

Petzold was born in Königswalde (Lubniewice), Brandenburg. As a child, he followed his parents in 1826 to Muskau, visiting the town's school and in 1828 the grammar school at Halle in Prussian Saxony.

In 1831, he started working at the Park von Muskau of the Prince Hermann von Pückler-Muskau, who turned out to be of great influence on his later work. 1835-38 he created his first Park at Matzdorf (Silesia). In 1844-52 he received the position of court gardener in Weimar, in 1852-1872 he returned as Parkinspector to Muskau, and was, in 1852-72, Director of Parks of the Netherlands.

He created 174 parks and gardens in Germany, Austria-Hungary, the Netherlands, Poland, Bulgaria, and Turkey.

He published frequently on his art, as well as biographical studies of other landscape gardeners, especially his study Fürst Hermann von Pückler-Muskau in seiner Bedeutung für die bildende Gartenkunst, of 1874.

See also
 Schloss and park Altenstein

Notes and Citations

Bibliography 
 Michael Rohde: Von Muskau bis Konstantinopel. Eduard Petzold ein europäischer Gartenkünstler [in German], Dresden: Verlag der Kunst, 1998, .

1815 births
1891 deaths
People from Sulęcin County
German gardeners
German landscape architects

People from the Province of Brandenburg
German male writers
People from Bad Muskau